Roy Early Blick (1899 – 1972) was the director of the Morals Division (the vice squad) of the Metropolitan Police Department of the District of Columbia (MPD) in the United States during the mid-twentieth-century.  He oversaw investigation of and apprehension for offenses related to burlesque, pornography, child pornography, and other obscenity and indecency, prostitution, crimes of "sex perversion" including homosexuality, and gambling.  Even before becoming director of the Morals Division, during his preceding career with the MPD, he was consulted by US federal lawmakers, testified before Congress on several occasions, and worked with the FBI on related law enforcement matters. Freedom of Information Act lawsuits in the twenty-first century revealed previously-classified documents indicating frequent meetings and correspondence between the Central Intelligence Agency and Blick during his service as a police official.

Blick oversaw operations similar to the later 1989 DC prostitute expulsion: en masse coercion of sex workers to leave the city.

In 1954 a newspaper report stated that US senators Styles Bridges and Herman Welker threatened to compel Blick's resignation if he did not take steps to ensure the prosecution of the son of fellow senator Lester C. Hunt—Lester Hunt, Jr.—who had been arrested for soliciting an undercover policeman.

Blick married Lee Anna Embrey, an author and charter staff member at the founding of the National Science Foundation who later joined the National Academy of Sciences.  His career in the MPD began in 1931 and he rose to the rank of Deputy Chief of Police.

References

External links
 FBI and Homosexuality Chronology: 1950-1959

1899 births
1972 deaths
Persecution of LGBT people in the United States
Discrimination in the United States
LGBT in Washington, D.C.
Sex crimes in the United States
History of LGBT civil rights in the United States
Metropolitan Police Department of the District of Columbia officers